Darko Marković (born 15 May 1987) is a Montenegrin footballer who plays as a midfielder for OFK Titograd. His transfer in 2008 from Fk Zeta to Fc Pakhtakor worth 1 milion $. He played Asian Champions League in three editions and helped the team to reach the quarter-final in 2009. The same year (2009) he was elected in the 'best eleven' in Asia Champions League by reputable world soccer website 'Goal.com'.

Club career
Marković has played for Pakhtakor in the three editions of the AFC Champions League, and helped the club reach the quarter-finals of the 2009 edition.

2009 website "Goal.com" marked him as one of the eleven best players in Asia champions league.

Also, the same year Russian website "Sports.ru" marked him as one of five best players in the former SSSR without Russian and Ukrainian players.

2010 website "The-Afc.com" marked him as a Key player of FC Pakhtakor.

2016 website "sports.uz" marked him in top 10 transfers in Uzbekistan Football history in third place, just after Luisao and Rivaldo.

References

External links
 

1987 births
Living people
Footballers from Podgorica
Association football midfielders
Serbia and Montenegro footballers
Montenegrin footballers
FK Budućnost Podgorica players
FK Zeta players
Pakhtakor Tashkent FK players
FK Dečić players
Újpest FC players
FK Lovćen players
FK Mogren players
FK Mladost Velika Obarska players
FK Željezničar Sarajevo players
Melaka United F.C. players
Kuala Lumpur City F.C. players
Erbil SC players
FK Mornar players
First League of Serbia and Montenegro players
Uzbekistan Super League players
Montenegrin First League players
Nemzeti Bajnokság I players
Premier League of Bosnia and Herzegovina players
Malaysia Super League players
Montenegrin expatriate footballers
Expatriate footballers in Uzbekistan
Montenegrin expatriate sportspeople in Uzbekistan
Expatriate footballers in Hungary
Montenegrin expatriate sportspeople in Hungary
Expatriate footballers in Bosnia and Herzegovina
Montenegrin expatriate sportspeople in Bosnia and Herzegovina
Expatriate footballers in Malaysia
Montenegrin expatriate sportspeople in Malaysia
Expatriate footballers in Iraq
Montenegrin Second League players
FK Arsenal Tivat players